Alice Mak Mei-kuen  (born 1 November 1971) is a Hong Kong politician, currently serving as Secretary for Home and Youth Affairs. She was formerly a member of the Legislative Council of Hong Kong for the Election Committee, representing the Hong Kong Federation of Trade Unions. She graduated from Department of English of the Chinese University of Hong Kong. She has been a member of the Kwai Tsing District Council since 1993, and represented the Wai Ying constituency until 2019.

Political career
Mak was handpicked by Wong Kwok-hing to run in the 2012 Hong Kong legislative election. She came in 8th place after Civic Party's Kwok Ka-ki received the most votes, and was elected to the Legislative Council of Hong Kong with 7.07% electorate support. Mak also participated in the 2016 legislative election, coming in 6th place after popular localist Eddie Chu topped the race with the most votes. She kept her seat on the Legislative Council after receiving 49,680 votes, which represented 8.32% of the electorate.

She lost her seat in the District Council during the 2019 elections following a general rout of pro-Beijing candidates amidst the 2019–20 Hong Kong protests. She was defeated by Civic Party's Henry Sin Ho-fai, losing to him with 40.12% of the votes. Mak admitted that she, along with other pro-establishment candidates, lost because the Hong Kong government "provoked many people with its way of administering".

On 18 June 2022, she resigned from the Legislative Council to become Hong Kong's Secretary for Home and Youth Affairs.

Controversies and views

Insulting Carrie Lam with profanities 
During the 2019–20 Hong Kong protests, Chief Executive Carrie Lam called for a meeting on 18 June with pro-Beijing lawmakers in Government House to explain her reasoning for suspending the controversial 2019 Hong Kong extradition bill. It was reported that Mak, who had publicly supported the bill in solidarity with the government up to this point, berated the chief executive for around five minutes using Cantonese profanities until Lam appeared to be in tears, to which Mak retorted in tears, "what use is crying now? You know how to cry, I do too!". The account was confirmed by a leaked conversation between pro-Beijing lawmaker Christopher Cheung and Independent Police Complaints Council chairman Anthony Neoh, who did not realise their microphones were still on during their breaks.

On 19 June, Mak was asked about the truthfulness of the account, but Mak refused to reveal the details of the meeting, stressing that the pro-Beijing camp does not support the government blindly. Hong Kong's two civil service unions, the Hong Kong Chinese Civil Servants’ Association and the Federation of Civil Service Unions, urged Mak to address the accusation and apologise to Carrie Lam if the reports were true.

National security law 
In October 2020, Mak pushed for an inquiry into whether filibustering at LegCo should be considered illegal, against the newly-enacted National Security Law.

Flag raising 
In February 2021, Mak insisted that universities in Hong Kong should be mandated to hold a weekly flag-raising ceremony of the PRC flag.

Patriots 
In March 2021, Mak supported changes proposed by the NPCSC to allow only "patriots" to govern Hong Kong, and claimed that the public was being misled by foreign forces, claiming that "I think the [Hong Kong] government should explain the articles in the Constitution [that electoral reform is under the NPC's purview], otherwise the public will be misled by these wrongful arguments put forward by foreign forces."

In April 2021, Mak claimed of the changes that "This is for the benefit of the whole society, so I hope the people of Hong Kong will vote in the coming election and I do hope that we'll have a high voting rate" and that the government should spread more propaganda on the changes.

Passports 
In April 2021, Mak said that candidates to the Legislative Council should disclose if they have foreign passports, including BN(O) passports.

Police state 
In June 2021, Mak said that there would be nothing wrong if Hong Kong were a police state; later, she claimed she was being sarcastic.

Youth Development Blueprint 
In December 2022, Mak said of youth that "We think understanding the nation is the first step of growing-up," and the Youth Development Blueprint would encourage nationhood, China's history, the Basic Law, and strengthening their sense of nationality.

Personal life 
On 23 February 2022, Mak was the second lawmaker after Edmund Wong to have tested positive for COVID-19.

References

1971 births
District councillors of Kwai Tsing District
Hong Kong Christians
Living people
Hong Kong trade unionists
Hong Kong Federation of Trade Unions
Alumni of the Chinese University of Hong Kong
HK LegCo Members 2012–2016
HK LegCo Members 2016–2021
HK LegCo Members 2022–2025
Members of the Election Committee of Hong Kong, 2012–2017
Members of the Election Committee of Hong Kong, 2021–2026
Hong Kong pro-Beijing politicians
Recipients of the Bronze Bauhinia Star
21st-century Hong Kong women politicians